The Arado E.500 was a concept for a heavy fighter created by Arado Flugzeugwerke in 1936.

Description
Due to a relatively short fuselage and an extended twin tail boom this aircraft type could accommodate a heavy attack and defense armament. The latter consisted of two revolving turrets on the upper and lower fuselage, each equipped with two 20 mm guns. The upper turret would be manually operated by a gunner, while the second gunner, located on the fuselage underside in a trough, aimed it via a periscope installation. The third gunner operated the fixed weapons in the nose of the machine. It had a twin tail.

Arado developed a 1:1 mock-up; however, it did not find the interest of the Technical Office of the Ministry of Aviation. The project was subsequently discontinued.

Specifications

References

Turret fighters